Historically, Chinese swords are classified into two types, the jian and the dao. A Jian is a straight, double-edged sword mainly used for stabbing, and has been commonly translated into the English language as a longsword; while a dao is a single-edged sword (mostly curved from the Song dynasty forward) mainly used for cutting, and has been translated as a saber or a "knife".

Bronze jians appeared during the Western Zhou period, and switched to the more durable wrought iron and steel during the late Warring States period. In modern times, the ceremonial commissioned officer's sword of the Chinese navy has been patterned after the traditional jian since 2008. Besides specialty weapons like the butterfly dao, Chinese swords are usually  in length. However, longer swords have been found on occasion.

Outside of Ancient China, Chinese swords were also used in Ancient Japan from the 3rd to the 6th century AD, but were replaced with native Japanese swords by the middle Heian era.

Bronze age: Shang dynasty (c. 1200 BC–c. 1046 BC) to Spring and Autumn period (771–476 BC)

Knives were found in Fu Hao's tomb, dated c. 1200 BC.

Bronze jians appeared during the Western Zhou. The blades were a mere 28 to 46 cm long. These short stabbing weapons were used as a last defense when all other options had failed.

By the late Spring and Autumn period, jians lengthened to about 56 cm. At this point, at least some soldiers used the jian rather than the dagger-axe due to its greater flexibility and portability. China started producing steel in the 6th century BC. Still, iron and steel tools were not produced in significant quantities until much later. By around 500 BC, however, the sword and shield combination began to be regarded as superior to the spear and dagger-axe.

Legendary swords
According to the Yuejue shu (Record of Precious Swords), the swordsmith Ou Yezi forged five treasured swords for Gan Jiang and King Zhao of Chu, named, respectively, Zhanlu (湛盧), Juque (巨闕), Shengxie (勝邪), Yuchang (魚腸) and Chunjun (純鈞). He also made three swords for King Goujian of Yue, named Longyuan (龍淵), Tai’e (泰阿) and Gongbu (工布). 

Chungou/Chunjun (Purity) - Its patterns resembled a row of stars in a constellation.
Zhanlu/Pilü (Black) - A sword made from the finest of the five metals and imbued with the essence of fire. It was said to be sensitive to its owner's behaviour and left of its own accord for the state of Chu when Helü's conduct offended it. When Helü became aware of King Zhao of Chu's possession of Zhanlu, he attacked Chu.
Haocao/Panying (Bravery/Hard) - Said to have been imbued with the aspect of lawlessness and was, therefore, of no use to anyone. It was used as a burial object.
Yuchang (Fish Belly) - A short dagger said to be capable of cleaving through iron as if it were mud. Used by Helü of Wu to assassinate his uncle, Liao of Wu. It was hidden in a cooked fish presented to King Liao at a banquet. As a result it gained a reputation for causing its user to be disloyal.
Juque (Great Destroyer) - Said to be incredibly durable and withstand even hitting or stabbing rock.
Shengxie (Victor over Evil)
Longyuan (Dragon Gulf) - Its shape resembled a high mountain and a deep gulf. Goujian used it to cut a gash in his thigh as self-punishment when he mistakenly executed an innocent person.
Taie (Great Riverbank) - Had patterns like the waves of a flowing river. The King of Chu used it to direct his army against a Jin invasion.
Gongbu (Artisanal Display) - Had patterns like flowing water that stop like pearls at the spine.

Gan Jiang and Mo Ye
According to the Spring and Autumn Annals of Wu and Yue, Ou Yezi was also the teacher of Gan Jiang, who was married to Mo Ye. King Helü of Wu ordered Gan Jiang and Mo Ye to forge a pair of swords for him in three months. However, the blast furnace failed to melt the metal. Mo Ye suggested that there was insufficient human qi in the stove, so the couple cut their hair and nails and cast them into the furnace, while 300 children helped to blow air into the bellows. In another account, Mo Ye sacrificed herself to increase human qi by throwing herself into the furnace. The desired result was achieved after three years, and the two swords were named after the couple. Gan Jiang kept the male sword, Ganjiang, for himself and presented the pair's female sword, Moye, to the King. The King, already upset that Gan Jiang had failed to supply the blades in three months but three years, became enraged when he discovered the smith had kept the male sword and thus had Gan Jiang killed.

Gan Jiang had already predicted the King's reaction, so he left behind a message for Mo Ye and their unborn son, telling them where he had hidden the Ganjiang Sword. Several months later, Mo Ye gave birth to Gan Jiang's son, Chi (赤), and years later, she told him his father's story. Chi was eager to avenge his father, and he sought the Ganjiang Sword. At the same time, the King dreamed of a youth who desired to kill him and placed a bounty on the youth's head. Chi was indignant and filled with anguish. He started crying on his way to enact his vengeance. An assassin found Chi, who told the killer his story. The assassin then suggested that Chi surrender his head and sword, and the assassin himself will avenge Ganjiang in Chi's place. He did as told and committed suicide. The killer was moved and decided to help Chi fulfil his quest.

The assassin severed Chi's head and brought it, along with the Ganjiang sword, to the overjoyed King. The king was, however, uncomfortable with Chi's head staring at him. The assassin asked the King to have Chi's head boiled, but Chi's head was still staring at the King even after 40 days without any sign of decomposition; thus, the assassin told the king that he needed to take a closer look and stare back for the head to decompose under the power of the King. The King bent over the cauldron, and the assassin seized the opportunity to decapitate him, his head falling into the pot alongside Chi's. The killer then cut off his own head, which also fell into the boiling water. The flesh on the heads was boiled away such that none of the guards could recognize which head belonged to whom. The guards and vassals decided that all three should be honoured as kings due to Chi and the assassin's bravery and loyalty. The three heads were eventually buried together at Yichun County, Runan, Henan, and the grave is called "Tomb of Three Kings".

Warring States period (475–221 BC)

Iron and steel swords of 80 to 100 cm in length appeared during the mid Warring States period in the states of Chu, Han, and Yan. Most weapons were still made of bronze, but iron and steel were starting to become more common. By the end of the 3rd century BC, the Chinese had learned how to produce quench-hardened steel swords, relegating bronze swords to ceremonial pieces.

The Zhan Guo Ce states that the state of Han made the best weapons, capable of cleaving through the strongest armour, shields, leather boots and helmets.

Wu and Yue swords
During the Warring States period, the Baiyue people were known for their swordsmanship and for producing fine swords. According to the Spring and Autumn Annals of Wu and Yue, King Goujian met a female sword fighter called Nanlin (Yuenü) who demonstrated mastery over the art. So he commanded his top five commanders to study her technique. Ever since the method came to be known as the "Sword of the Lady of Yue". The Yue were also thought to have possessed  mystical knives embued with the talismanic power of dragons or other amphibious creatures.

The Zhan Guo Ce mentions the high quality of southern swords and their ability to cleave through oxen, horses, bowls, and basins. However, they would shatter if used on a pillar or rock. Wu and Yue's swords were highly valued, and those who owned them would hardly ever use them for fear of damage. However, these swords were commonplace in Wu and Yue and treated with less reverence. The Yuejue shu (Record of Precious Swords) mentions several named swords: Zhanlu (Black), Haocao (Bravery), Juque (Great Destroyer), Lutan (Dew Platform), Chunjun (Purity), Shengxie (Victor over Evil), Yuchang (Fish-belly), Longyuan (Dragon Gulf), Taie (Great Riverbank), and Gongbu (Artisanal Display). Many of these were made by the Yue swordsmith Ou Yezi.

Even after Wu and Yue were assimilated into larger Chinese polities, the memory of their swords lived on. During the Han dynasty, Liu Pi King of Wu (195-154 BC) had a sword named Wujian to honour the history of metalworking in his kingdom.

Qin dynasty (221–206 BC)

Sword dances are first mentioned shortly after the end of the Qin dynasty. Swords up to 110 cm in length began to appear.

Han dynasty (206 BC–220 AD)

The jian was mentioned as one of the "Five Weapons" during the Han dynasty, the other four being dao, spear, halberd, and staff. Another version of the Five Weapons lists the bow and crossbow as one weapon, the jian and dao as one weapon, in addition to halberd, shield, and armour.

The jian was a popular personal weapon during the Han era, and a class of swordsmen emerged who made their living through fencing. Sword fencing was also a popular pastime for aristocrats. A 37-chapter manual known as the Way of the Jian is known to have existed but is no longer extant. South and central China were said to have produced the best sworders. Han dynasty swords made between the 1st and 2nd centuries AD have been found in Japan; a ring-pommel dao with an inscription "thirty-fold refined" and a jian with the inscription "fifty-fold refined". A jian in Nara Prefecture was also found with an inscription saying it was produced in the Zhongping era (184-189 AD) and "hundredfold refined."

There existed a weapon called the "Horse Beheading Jian" because it was supposedly able to cut off a horse's head. However, another source says it was an execution tool used on special occasions rather than a military weapon.

The ring-pommel backsword (環首刀) also became widespread as a weapon of cavalry warfare during the Han era. Being single-edged, the backsword had the advantage of a thickened dull side that strengthen the whole sword, making it less prone to breaking. When paired with a shield, it made for a suitable replacement for the jian. Hence it became the more popular choice as time went on. After the Han, sword dances using the dao rather than the jian are mentioned to have occurred. Archaeological samples range from 86 to 114 cm in length.

An account of Duan Jiong's tactical formation in 167 AD specifies that he arranged "…three ranks of halberds (長鏃 changzu), swordsmen (利刃 liren) and spearmen (長矛 changmao), supported by crossbows (強弩 qiangnu), with light cavalry (輕騎 jingji) on each wing."

Three Kingdoms (184/220–280)

Swords of idiosyncratic sizes are mentioned. One individual named Chen apparently wielded a great sword over two meters in length.

Sun Quan's wife had over a hundred female attendants armed with daos.

By the end of the Three Kingdoms the dao had completely overtaken the jian as the primary close combat weapon. The lighter and less durable double-edged jian entered the domain of court dancers, officials, and expert warriors.

Northern and Southern dynasties (420–589)

In the 6th century, Qimu Huaiwen introduced to Northern Qi the process of 'co-fusion' steelmaking, which used metals of different carbon contents to create steel. Apparently, daos made using this method were capable of penetrating 30 armour lamellae. It's not clear if the armour was of iron or leather.

Tang dynasty (618–907)

The dao was separated into four categories during the Tang dynasty. These were the Ceremonial Dao 儀刀, Defense Dao 障刀, Cross Dao 橫刀, and Divided Dao 陌刀. The Ceremonial Dao was a court item usually decorated with gold and silver. It was also known as the "Imperial Sword". The Defense Dao does not have any specifications but its name is self-explanatory. The Cross Dao was a waist weapon worn on the belt, hence its older name, the Belt Dao. It was often carried as a sidearm by crossbowmen. The Divided Dao, also called a Long Dao (long saber), was a cross between a polearm and a saber. It consisted of a 91 cm blade fixed to a long 120 cm handle ending in an iron butt point, although exceptionally large weapons reaching 3 meters in length and weighing 10.2 kg have been mentioned. Divided daos were wielded by elite Tang vanguard forces and used to spearhead attacks.

Song dynasty (960–1279)

Some warriors and bandits duel wielded daos to break deadlocks in confined terrain during the late Song dynasty.

According to the Xu Zizhi Tongjian Changbian, written in 1183, the "Horse Beheading Dao" (zhanmadao) was a two handed saber with a 93.6 cm blade, 31.2 cm hilt, and ring pommel.

Yuan dynasty (1279–1368)

Under the Yuan dynasty, the jian experienced a resurgence and was used more often.

Ming dynasty (1368–1644)

The dao continued to fill the role of the basic close combat weapon. The jian fell out of favor again in the Ming era but saw limited use by a small number of arms specialists. It was otherwise known for its qualities as a marker of scholarly refinement.

The "Horse Beheading Dao" was described in Ming sources as a 96 cm blade attached to a 128 cm shaft, essentially a glaive. It's speculated that the Swede Frederick Coyett was talking about this weapon when he described Zheng Chenggong's troops wielding "with both hands a formidable battle-sword fixed to a stick half the length of a man".

Qi Jiguang deployed his soldiers in a 12-man 'mandarin duck' formation, which consisted of four pikemen, two men carrying daos with a great and small shield, two 'wolf brush' wielders, a rearguard officer, and a porter.

Ming-Qing sword types

See also
 Chinese swordsmanship
 Chinese armour
 Chinese siege weapons
 Weapons and armor in Chinese mythology
 Japanese sword
 Indian sword
 Korean sword

References

Bibliography
.
 
 
 

 

 

 Late Imperial Chinese Armies: 1520-1840 C.J. Peers, Illustrated by Christa Hook, Osprey Publishing «Men-at-arms»,

External links
http://www.shadowofleaves.com/Chinese_Sword_History.htm
http://www.chinesesword.net/Swordplay/Swordplay1E.htm

 
17th-century BC establishments
Blade weapons
Chinese swordsmanship